Koloman Moser (30 March 1868 – 18 October 1918) was an Austrian artist who exerted considerable influence on twentieth-century graphic art. He was one of the foremost artists of the Vienna Secession movement and a co-founder of Wiener Werkstätte.

Moser designed a wide array of art works, including books and graphic works from postage stamps to magazine vignettes; fashion; stained glass windows, porcelains and ceramics, blown glass, tableware, silver, jewelry, and furniture.

Biography
Moser was born in Vienna in 1868 to parents Josef and Thresia Moser (née Hirsch); he was the oldest of three siblings. studied at the Wiener Akademie and the Kunstgewerbeschule, where he also taught from 1899.

Moser's designs in architecture, furniture, jewellery, graphics, and tapestries helped characterise the work of this era. He drew upon the clean lines and repetitive motifs of classical Greek and Roman art and architecture in reaction to the Baroque decadence of his turn-of-the-century Viennese surroundings. In 1901/1902, he published a portfolio titled Die Quelle ("The Source") of elegant graphic designs for such things as tapestries, fabrics, and wallpaper.

In 1903, Moser and his colleague Josef Hoffmann founded Wiener Werkstätte, whose studios and artisans produced a number of aesthetically and functionally designed household goods, including glassware, flatware, silverware, rugs and textiles. In 1904, he created the Apse mosaic and glass windows for the Kirche am Steinhof in Vienna, and designed the decoration of the Medallion House of the Linke Wienzeile Buildings for architect Otto Wagner. 

In 1905, together with the Klimt group, he separated from the Vienna Secession. The same year, he married Editha (Ditha) Mautner von Markhof, an artist in her own right as well as the daughter to one of Austria's great industry fortunes. Due to internal conflicts and as his plans for reorganising the Werkstätte (to cope with financial problems) weren't realised, Moser withdrew from the Wiener Werkstätte in 1907.

Moser became ill with throat cancer in 1916. Correspondence with Alfred Roller detailed Moser's despair over who would succeed to his position at the University of Applied Arts Vienna. Moser died on 18 October 1918; he was buried three days later in the Hietzing Cemetery.

Legacy

Moser was one of the designers for Austria's leading art journal Ver Sacrum. This art journal paid great attention to design and was designed mainly by Moser, Gustav Klimt and Josef Hoffmann.

One of Moser's most prominent designs used in a building (The Steinhof Church) was selected as a main motif of one of the most famous euro collectors coins: the Austrian 100 euro Steinhof Church commemorative coin, minted on 9 November 2005. On the reverse of the coin, the Koloman Moser stained glass window over the main entrance can be seen. In the centre of the window is God the Father seated on a throne. The window is flanked with a pair of bronze angels in Jugendstil style, originally designed by Othmar Schimkowitz.

On 3 May 2010 Swann Galleries auctioned the third volume in Moser's three-volume series "Die Quelle," containing 30 sumptuous decorations for flat surfaces, such as tapestries, wallpaper and fabrics, in the original portfolio. Each plate was double-sided, with a colour design on one side and a black-and-white design on the other. It sold for an auction record price of $12,600.

To commemorate the centennial of his death, the Museum of Applied Arts Vienna (MAK) honored Moser with one of the most comprehensive solo shows to date (19 December 2018-22 April 2019).

Gallery

Notes

Bibliography

 Stefan Üner: Koloman Moser. The Photographic Eye, in: PhotoResearcher, No 31, Vienna 2019, p. 134–147.
Stefan Üner: Die Kunst der Präsentation. Koloman Moser als Ausstellungsdesigner, in: Parnass, 4/2018, p. 22–24.
Stefan Üner: The Art Of Presentation. Koloman Moser As Exhibition Designer, Dissertation. University of Applied Arts Vienna, Vienna 2016

Thun-Hohenstein, Christoph; Witt-Dörring, Christian; Schmuttermeier, Elisabeth eds. (2019) Koloman Moser. Universalkünstler zwischen Gustav Klimt und Josef Hoffmann/Universal Artist between Gustav Klimt and Josef Hoffmann, exhibition catalogue for the MAK/Austrian Museum of Applied Art, Birkhäuser, Basel. .
Witt-Dörring, Christian, ed. (2013) Koloman Moser. Designing Modern Vienna 1897/1907, exhibition catalogue for the Neue Galerie New York, Prestel Verlag, New York. .

External links

Koloman Moser Online Catalogue Raisonné
Koloman Moser as a painter – Speech by Stefan Üner
Wiener Werkstätte (de/en)
Koloman Moser at WOKA (de/en)
 Koloman Moser article in cosmopolis.ch
 Biography, Literature and Works by Koloman Moser
 Koloman Moser at Museum of Applied Arts (MAK), Vienna (de/en)

1868 births
1918 deaths
Artists from Vienna
Austrian stamp designers
Austrian designers
Austrian illustrators
Deaths from cancer in Austria
Deaths from prostate cancer
Academy of Fine Arts Vienna alumni
Members of the Vienna Secession
Art Nouveau designers
Art Nouveau illustrators
Wiener Werkstätte